Lifecycle management or life-cycle management may refer to:

 Application lifecycle management in software
 Building lifecycle management, the design and construction of buildings
 Engineering lifecycle management, a product and software development platform by IBM
 Information lifecycle management, in computer data storage
 Plant lifecycle management, in industrial facility management
 Product lifecycle management (marketing)
 Product lifecycle management, in engineering and manufacturing
 Virtual machine lifecycle management, in computer systems administration

See also 
LCM (disambiguation)
Life-cycle assessment